Lance R. Koth is an American politician. He is a Republican representing the 20th district in the South Dakota House of Representatives.

Political career 

In 2018, Koth ran for election to one of two seats representing District 20 in the South Dakota House of Representatives. He and fellow Republican Paul Miskimins won against Democrats Ione Klinger and James Schorzmann.

As of July 2020, Koth sits on the following committees:
 Committee on Appropriations
 Joint Committee on Appropriations
 Interim Appropriations Committee

Electoral record

References 

Year of birth missing (living people)
Living people
Republican Party members of the South Dakota House of Representatives
21st-century American politicians